The Story Bible is a book by Pearl S. Buck summarizing the whole Bible in two separate volumes: Vol. 1, The Old Testament, and Vol. 2, The New Testament, while particularly emphasizing literal elements and fables. It is described as a paraphrase.

The Story Bible

The Story Bible is a book for anyone interested in the Bible. Whether it is for reading popular Bible stories (Noah's Ark, or The Creation Story), or as a down to earth introduction to the Bible. For those already familiar with the Bible this book revives stories that have been read over and over, and adds life and animation to the story. For those who are not familiar with the Bible it breaks down the actual Bible stories and gives them real world relevance for individuals to understand. Regardless of religion or age this book is a great read and brings age-old Bible stories to life, told magically and with a broad literary spectrum that entices the reader and keep them captivated throughout. With Pearl Buck's unmatched ability to tell stories this renowned author retells 72 of the Bible's most memorable stories in “language both understandable and enjoyable to the modern reader”.

About the Author

Pearl Sydenstricker was born to Caroline Stulting and Absalom Sydenstricker in Hillsboro, West Virginia, on June 26, 1892. Her career began in China where she married an agricultural economist missionary named John Loosing Buck in 1917. They moved to a small town on the Huai River called Suzhou, Anhui Province.

From 1920 to 1933 they lived in Nanjing, on the campus of the University of Nanking, where the couple held teaching positions. Pearl taught English literature at the school. The Nanking Incident led to the couple leaving the campus. In 1934 Pearl got an invitation to the United States to speak at a Presbyterian women luncheon. She left China never to return.

Her writing career consisted of winning two notable awards, the Pulitzer Prize in 1932 and in 1938, she was awarded the Nobel Prize in Literature "for her rich and truly epic descriptions of peasant life in China and for her biographical masterpieces." [1] In 1935 the couple got divorced and Pearl later remarried to Richard Walsh. Upon her return to the United States she continued her outstanding writing career, and became an advocate for women and minority group rights. In 1973 she died of lung cancer at the age of 80 and was buried Perkasie, Pennsylvania.

References

1971 non-fiction books
Biblical paraphrases
1971 in Christianity